Nestroyplatz may refer to:

 Nestroyplatz (Vienna U-Bahn), a station on line U1
 Nestroyplatz Square, a square in Vienna named after Johann Nestroy